Whiterock is a small village in County Down, Northern Ireland. It is within the townland of Killinakin, in the civil parish of Killinchy and historic barony of Dufferin, on the western shore of Strangford Lough, near to the village of Killinchy. It is in the Ards and North Down Borough. It had a population of 355 people (141 households) in the 2011 Census. (2001 Census: 351 people)

Whiterock is home to two yacht clubs: Strangford Lough Yacht Club and 1.5 km to the north, Down Cruising Club. The latter is based in a moored former lightship, the Petrel, acquired in 1968. The lightship had been built by the Dublin Dockyard Company in 1915 for the Commissioners of Irish Lights and since registered as a National Historic Ship UK.

Between the two yacht clubs is Sketrick Castle, a 15th-century tower house on Sketrick Island, now in ruins. To the south of Whiterock is Ballymorran Bay.

See also 
List of villages in Northern Ireland

References 

Villages in County Down
Civil parish of Killinchy
Ards Borough Council